Rahimtoola is a Hindic surname that may refer to
Fazal I. Rahimtoola (1895–1977), Indian politician 
Habib Rahimtoola (1912–1991), Pakistani politician 
Hoosenaly Rahimtoola (1890–1977), Mayor of Bombay, India 
Ibrahim Rahimtoola (1862–1942), Indian politician 
Jafar Rahimtoola Kaderbhoy (1870–1912), Indian barrister 
Razia Rahimtoola (1919–1988), Pakistani pediatrician
Shabuddin H. Rahimtoola (born 1931), Indian cardiologist
Shamsuddin H. Rahimtoola (1936–2016), Pakistani physician 
Zubeida Rahimtoola (1917–2015), Pakistani politician 

Urdu-language surnames